The 1920–21 Yorkshire Cup was the thirteenth occasion on which the  Yorkshire Cup competition had been held. This year saw a new name on the  trophy, when previously twice beaten finalists (1906 and 1911), Hull Kingston Rovers won the  trophy at the  third attempt by beating close neighbours and fierce rivals Hull F.C. by the score of 2-0 in the final. The match was played at Headingley, Leeds, now in West Yorkshire. The attendance was 20,000 and receipts were £1,926. This was the first of only three meetings between the teams which would take place in the  finals in the long history of the tournament

Background 

The Rugby Football League's Yorkshire Cup competition was a knock-out competition between (mainly professional) rugby league clubs from  the  county of Yorkshire. The actual area was at times increased to encompass other teams from  outside the  county such as Newcastle, Mansfield, Coventry, and even London (in the form of Acton & Willesden. The Rugby League season always (until the onset of "Summer Rugby" in 1996) ran from around August-time through to around May-time and this competition always took place early in the season, in the Autumn, with the final taking place in (or just before) December (The only exception to this was when disruption of the fixture list was caused during, and immediately after, the two World Wars).

Competition and Results 
This season there were no junior/amateur clubs taking part, no new entrants and no "leavers" and so the total of entries remained the  same at thirteen. This in turn resulted in three byes in the first round.

Round 1 
Involved  5 matches (with three byes) and 13 clubs

Round 1 - Replays  
Involved  1 match and 2 clubs

Round 2 – quarterfinals 
Involved 4 matches and 8 clubs

Round 3 – semifinals  
Involved 2 matches and 4 clubs

Final

Teams and scorers 

Scoring - Try = three (3) points - Goal = two (2) points - Drop goal = two (2) points

The road to success

Notes 
1 * the attendance was a never to be bettered ground record

2 * Headingley, Leeds, is the home ground of Leeds RLFC with a capacity of 21,000. The record attendance was  40,175 for a league match between Leeds and Bradford Northern on 21 May 1947.

See also 
1920–21 Northern Rugby Football Union season
Rugby league county cups

References

External links
Saints Heritage Society
1896–97 Northern Rugby Football Union season at wigan.rlfans.com
Hull&Proud Fixtures & Results 1896/1897
Widnes Vikings - One team, one passion Season In Review - 1896-97
The Northern Union at warringtonwolves.org

RFL Yorkshire Cup
Yorkshire Cup